Sel is a quartet of Lithuanian performers. They are well known for their numerous chart-topping singles and albums in the Baltic countries. The group's head is Egidijus Dragunas. The group also contains a DJ, a back-vocalist and songwriter and a non-electronic instrument player. The group's style has changed throughout the years - the first albums created by Sel are usually categorized as Hip-Hop and rock works. With their later albums, Sel turned to a more Acid-House/R&B style, but still remained loyal to their original fast-paced rap vocals and light crunk. The group has worked with many European artists and created over thirty songs that have ranked high on the top 40 Hottest Lithuanian Songs List.

Links 
 Official SEL channel in Youtube.com
 Official SEL fans page in Facebook.com
 Official SEL homepage

Lithuanian musical groups